Schönbrunn  is a station on  of the Vienna U-Bahn. It is located in the Hietzing District. It opened as part of the Wiener Stadtbahn in 1898 and became an U-Bahn station in 1981.

References

Buildings and structures in Hietzing
Railway stations opened in 1898
Vienna U-Bahn stations
Art Nouveau architecture in Vienna
Art Nouveau railway stations
Otto Wagner buildings
1898 establishments in Austria
Railway stations in Austria opened in the 19th century